The men's 800 metre freestyle competition of the swimming events at the 2015 World Aquatics Championships was held on 4 August with the heats and 5 August with the final.

Records
Prior to the competition, the existing world and championship records were as follows.

Results

Heats
The heats were held at 10:30.

Final

The final was held at 18:58.

References

Men's 800 metre freestyle
World Aquatics Championships